Elias Ahmed Ali (born 12 December 1997) is a Qatari professional footballer who plays as a left back.

Career statistics

Club

Notes

References

1997 births
Living people
Qatari footballers
Association football fullbacks
Al-Gharafa SC players
Al-Wakrah SC players
Qatar Stars League players